Fathabad-e Sofla (also Romanized as Fatḩābād-e Soflá; also known as Fāteḩābād and Fatḩābād) is a village in Rudbal Rural District, in the Central District of Marvdasht County, Fars Province, Iran. At the 2006 census, its population was 4,688, in 1,106 families.

References 

Populated places in Marvdasht County